Gordon David Manson (born 19 May 1960) is a Scottish-born Austrian professional golfer.

Manson has had a successful career on the European Senior Tour which he joined in 2011. Manson led the final stage of the 2010 Qualifying school after three of the four rounds but had a last round of 75 to finish tied for seventh place, receiving a conditional card for the 2011 season. He has won twice; the 2015 Swiss Seniors Open and the 2016 Acorn Jersey Open. He has also been runner-up in the 2014 Travis Perkins Masters, the 2015 ISPS Handa PGA Seniors Championship and the 2015 Prostate Cancer UK Scottish Senior Open. He was fourth in the 2015 European Senior Tour Order of Merit and ninth in 2016.

Professional wins (7)

Challenge Tour wins (1)

Alps Tour wins (3)

Other wins (1)
1993 Diners Club Championship

European Senior Tour wins (2)

European Senior Tour playoff record (1–1)

Results in major championships

CUT = missed the half-way cut
Note: Manson only played in The Open Championship.

Results in senior major championships

"T" = Tied
CUT = missed the halfway cut
Note: Manson only played in the Senior PGA Championship and the Senior British Open Championship.

Team appearances
World Cup (representing Austria): 1997

References

External links

Scottish male golfers
Austrian male golfers
European Tour golfers
European Senior Tour golfers
Golfers from St Andrews
1960 births
Living people